Assomption station is a Montreal Metro station in the borough of Mercier–Hochelaga-Maisonneuve, Montreal, Quebec. It is operated by the Société de transport de Montréal (STM) and serves the Green Line. It is in the district of Hochelaga-Maisonneuve. The station opened some time after 6 June 1976
, as part of the extension of the Green Line to Honoré-Beaugrand.

Overview 
Designed by Duplessis and Labelle, it is a normal side platform station built of concrete partially in tunnel, with access through a deep open cut leading to the single entrance. Murals by Guy Montpetit are exhibited in the entrance building and the hallways to the stairwell.

Origin of the name
This station (formerly named L'Assomption, a name still seen on the station's nameplates) is named for boul. de l'Assomption, so named in 1951 to commemorate Pope Pius XII's confirmation of the dogma of the Assumption of Mary in his 1950 apostolic constitution Munificentissimus Deus.

Connecting bus routes

Nearby points of interest
 Hôpital Maisonneuve-Rosemont
 Municipal golf course
 CLSC Olivier-Guimond
 Complexe Raycom
 Village Olympique

References

External links

 Assomption Station - official site
 Montreal by Metro, metrodemontreal.com - photos, information, and trivia
 2011 STM System Map
 Metro Map

Green Line (Montreal Metro)
Mercier–Hochelaga-Maisonneuve
Railway stations in Canada opened in 1976